The Florence Phantoms were a professional indoor football team based out of Florence, South Carolina, in the United States.  They were an expansion member of the American Indoor Football Association (AIFA) in 2006, and were the AIFA Champions of the 2008 season.  They played their home games at Florence Civic Center.

On Saturday, April 8, 2006, after losing their first four games, the Phantoms got their very first-ever win in a 54–30 home upset against the Raleigh Rebels.

On Friday, June 23, 2006, the Phantoms announced that they would return for the 2007 season.

2008 was the Phantoms' best season by far: after winning the Eastern Division Championship with a 10–4 record, the Phantoms went on to defeat the Huntington Heroes in the first round of the playoffs, followed by the Reading Express in the Eastern Conference championship, and finally defeating the Wyoming Cavalry 48–12 to win the AIFA Championship Bowl on their home turf.

The Phantoms did not return after the 2009 season.

Season-by-season

|-
| colspan="6" align="center" | Florence Phantoms (AIFL)
|-
|2006 || 4 || 10 || 0 || 7th Southern || --
|-
| colspan="6" align="center" | Florence Phantoms (AIFA)
|-
|2007 || 4 || 9 || 0 || 6th Southern || --
|-
|2008 || 10 || 4 || 0 || 1st EC Eastern || Won ECE Round 1 (Huntington)Won EC Championship (Reading)Won AIFA Championship Bowl II (Wyoming)
|-
|2009 || 6 || 8 || 0 || 5th Southern || --
|-
!Totals || 27 || 31 || 0
|colspan="2"| (including playoffs)

Game Results

2007

2008

2009

External links
 Official site of the Florence Phantoms
 Phantoms' 2006 season & results
 Phantoms' 2007 stats
 Phantoms' 2008 stats
 Phantoms' 2009 stats

American Indoor Football Association teams
American Indoor Football League teams
Florence, South Carolina
American football teams in South Carolina
Defunct indoor American football teams
American football teams established in 2006
American football teams disestablished in 2009
2006 establishments in South Carolina
2009 disestablishments in South Carolina